How I Met Your Mother is an American sitcom written and created by Carter Bays and Craig Thomas. It was first aired on September 19, 2005 on CBS with a thirty-minute pilot episode, and finished its planned nine-year run on March 31, 2014. Set in present-day Manhattan, New York City, the series follows the social and romantic lives of Ted Mosby (Josh Radnor) and his four best friends, Marshall Eriksen (Jason Segel), Robin Scherbatsky (Cobie Smulders), Lily Aldrin (Alyson Hannigan), and Barney Stinson (Neil Patrick Harris), as Ted seeks out his future wife (Cristin Milioti). The show tells this story through the framing device of "future" Ted (Bob Saget) as an unreliable narrator who is recounting to his son and daughter the events that led him to their mother. In Seasons 1–8, episodes are typically set to a similar timeline as its real-world airdate, with the season finale generally taking place in the spring and the next season premiere in the fall, usually with a quick recap of the events that took place during the summer. The final season (season 9) deviates from this format by taking place immediately after the end of the previous season and encompassing only the weekend of Barney's and Robin's wedding. The series finale covers several years that follow.

How I Met Your Mother premiered to nearly 11 million viewers and maintained a generally steady viewership. The first seven seasons are available on DVD in Region 1, 2, and 4, while the season eight DVD was released in Region 1 and 2 in October 2013. In addition, all nine seasons are currently available for streaming on Hulu and Amazon Prime and can be purchased on the Apple TV app from the iTunes Store in the US and on Disney+ in Australia.

Series overview

Episodes

Season 1 (2005–06)

Season 2 (2006–07)

Season 3 (2007–08)

Season 4 (2008–09)

Season 5 (2009–10)

Season 6 (2010–11)

Season 7 (2011–12)

Season 8 (2012–13)

Season 9 (2013–14)

Ratings

Notes

References 

General references

External links 

 
 

 
How I Met Your Mother
How I Met Your Mother